Berkanan is the reconstructed Proto-Germanic name of the b rune , meaning "birch". In the Younger Futhark it is called Bjarkan in the Icelandic and Norwegian rune poems. In the Anglo-Saxon rune poem it is called  beorc ("birch" or "poplar"). The corresponding Gothic letter is 𐌱 b, named bairkan.

The letter shape is likely directly  based on Old Italic  𐌁, whence comes also the Latin letter B.

The rune is recorded in all three rune poems:

See also
Elder Futhark
Rune poem
Beith (letter)
Loki
Bluetooth

References

Runes